The William Gedamke House is a historic residence in Gresham, Oregon, United States. Prominently located near Gresham's original business core, it is one of the finest expressions of the Queen Anne style in the city. It was constructed circa 1900, about the time the first interurban trains reached Gresham from Portland. The design was based on a widely circulated 1891 mail-order plan book by George F. Barber.

The house was adapted for commercial use starting in 1985. It was added to the National Register of Historic Places in 1989.

See also
National Register of Historic Places listings in Multnomah County, Oregon

Notes

References

External links
 

1900 establishments in Oregon
Buildings and structures in Gresham, Oregon
Houses completed in 1900
Houses in Multnomah County, Oregon
Houses on the National Register of Historic Places in Oregon
National Register of Historic Places in Gresham, Oregon
Queen Anne architecture in Oregon